Marli is a leading manufacturer of noncarbonated drinks in Finland. In 2001, the German group Eckes-Granini acquired all shares in the company. 

Marli's assortment include juice brands like Mehukatti, Juissi and Trip.

External links
Oy Marli Ab
Marli - Eckes-Granini, The No.1 fruit juice company in Europe strengthens its position by acquiring Finnish Oy Marli Ab

Drink companies of Finland